Alfred Kennerley (10 October 1810 – 15 November 1897) was an Australian politician and Premier of Tasmania from 4 August 1873 until 20 July 1876.

Kennerley was born in Islington. He was a man of means who came from England to Australia when young and settled in New South Wales. On 18 February 1834 at Windsor he married Jane, daughter of Richard Rouse of Rouse Hill House. When his father died Kennerley leased his land and sold his livestock, planning to return to England. He sailed with his wife for London in March 1842 and returned to Sydney in January 1845. He resumed farming at Bringelly, became a magistrate and, in trust for his wife, acquired from Rouse more property in Parramatta. Kennerley was not robust and found the climate very trying. In 1853 he returned to England with his wife.

In June 1857 the Kennerleys arrived at Hobart in the Gloucester and named their new home Rouseville. He became an alderman about 1860, and was mayor in 1862, 1863, 1871 and 1872. He was elected to Parliament and on 4 August 1873 became premier without office.

On 15 August 1873, William Lodewyk Crowther threatened Kennerley with violence when Kennerley mentioned Crowther's theft of Aboriginal Tasmanian remains:

His ministry initiated a policy of public works, but though there was really little difference between the parties, there was a good deal of political strife, and it was difficult to get anything constructive done.  Kennerley became discouraged and resigned on 20 July 1876. This was the only time he was in office, but he was well known for the remainder of his long life as a staunch supporter of the Church of England, and as one of the most philanthropic and high-principled citizens of Hobart. He died in his eighty-eighth year on 15 November 1897. His wife died many years before him and he had no children.

References

 

1810 births
1897 deaths
Members of the Tasmanian Legislative Council
Premiers of Tasmania
Mayors and Lord Mayors of Hobart
People from Islington (district)
19th-century Australian politicians
English emigrants to colonial Australia
Tasmanian local councillors